Crater Lake is a volcanic crater, now filled with water, lying north-west of Mount Kirkwood on the south side of Deception Island, in the South Shetland Islands of Antarctica. The descriptive name was given by the United Kingdom Antarctic Place-Names Committee (UK-APC) in 1959.

Antarctic Specially Protected Area
The site forms part of an Antarctic Specially Protected Area (ASPA 140), comprising several separate sites on Deception Island, and designated as such primarily for its botanic and ecological values.

References

Geography of Deception Island
Lakes of the South Shetland Islands
Antarctic Specially Protected Areas